Queen of Knives is an opera in two acts by the American composer Eric Stern. The English libretto was written by the composer. The opera premiered in Portland, Oregon, on May 7, 2010, at the Interstate Firehouse Cultural Center. Noah Mickens directed the premiere and the opera was produced by Vagabond Opera and Wanderlust Circus.

Production history
Queen of Knives premiered at the Interstate Firehouse Cultural Center In Portland, Oregon, May 7, 2010, and ran for a two-week extended run, for a total of ten performances.

Roles and original cast

Esmeralda: Catherine Olson
Henry: Scott Crandal
Chaim Meyer: Eric Stern
Promethia: Nagasita
Alfred: Robin Jackson
The Blackbird Katrina: Ashia Grzesik
The Belly Dancer: Ruby Beh/Tiffany Slottke
Roustabouts: Xander Almeida, Rale Sidebottom, Hioka

Musical Ensemble
Musical Director: Eric Stern; Tenor Saxophone, Clarinet: Robin Jackson; Trumpet: Kate Presley; Percussion: Mark Burdon; Piano, Accordion: Eric Stern; Violin: Griff Bear;Cello: Skip Von Kuske; Bass: Matthew Rotchford

Synopsis

Set in the early 1960s in a traveling carnival in the midst of the student protests in Birmingham, Alabama, the opera tells the story of a brother and sister knife-throwing act.

Sources

D'Antoni, Vagabond Opera's Opera: Eric Stern on 'Queen of Knives', Oregon Music News, May 5, 2010
Interstate Firehouse Cultural Center, Queen of Knives: A Knife Throwing Bullseye Opera
McQuillen, James, Opera review: "Portland's Vagabond Opera's 'Queen of Knives' is one sharp show", The Oregonian, May 11, 2010
Oregon Music News, "Vagabond Opera announces they're really doing an opera", March 3, 2010

External links
Eric Stern official website
Vagabond Opera official website
Wanderlust Circus official website

Operas
Operas set in the United States
2010 operas
English-language operas
Operas by Eric Stern